"Treat Her Right" is a soul music song, with a standard 12-bar-blues structure.  Written by Roy Head and Gene Kurtz, it was recorded by Head and The Traits and released on the Back Beat label in 1965.

Background
Members of the Traits on this record included Johnny Clark on lead guitar, Frank Miller on rhythm guitar,  Gene Kurtz on bass, Dan Buie on keyboards, Danny Gomez and Tommy May on tenor sax, Johnny Gibson on trumpet, and Jerry Gibson on drums.

In the ending instrumental choruses, Roy Head's voice is heard repeatedly shouting "HEY", and saying ad-libs including "You're too much, baby".

In 1965 the band signed with producer Huey Meaux of Houston, who maintained a stable of record labels. "Treat Her Right" was recorded at Gold Star Studios (later known as SugarHill Recording Studios) in Houston.  Issued on Don Robey's (Nov. 1, 1903 - June 16, 1975) Back Beat label, it reached #2 on both the U.S. Pop and R&B charts in 1965, behind The Beatles' "Yesterday." "Treat Her Right", with its blazing horns and punchy rhythm, credited to Head and bass man Gene Kurtz, established Head as a prime exponent of blue-eyed soul. By 1995 "Treat Her Right" had been covered by as many as 20 nationally known recording artists including the Yardbirds/Led Zeppelin legend Jimmy Page, Bruce Springsteen, Jerry Lee Lewis, Bon Jovi, British blue-eyed soul vocalist Chris Farlowe (under the title "Treat Her Good") and both Mae West and Barbara Mandrell under the title of "Treat Him Right".  Even Bob Dylan, Sammy Davis Jr. and Tom Jones covered it "live".

Roy Head and the Traits "Just a Little Bit" and the bluesy-rockabilly hybrid, "Apple Of My Eye" also cracked the Top 40 in 1965.  However, those were only minor hits in the wake of "Treat Her Right", which is estimated to have sold over four million copies worldwide, and was a featured song, along with Wilson Pickett's "Mustang Sally" and Steve Cropper's "In the Midnight Hour", in the successful 1991 motion picture, The Commitments.

Chart performance
The song reached number two in the United States on both the Billboard pop and R&B charts. The Beatles' "Yesterday" kept "Treat Her Right" from the number one spot on the Billboard Hot 100. In Canada, the song reached number 8. In the UK, the song reached number 30.

Covers
It was independently recorded in 1971 by country singers, Billy "Crash" Craddock and Barbara Mandrell. Mandrell's version, "Treat Him Right," flipped the genders to have the song come from a woman's perspective. 
The song was also covered by Roy Buchanan on his Second Album in 1973. 
Rory Gallagher recorded a cover version (later included as a CD bonus track) for his 1973 album, Blueprint. 
Guitarist Arlen Roth covered it on his 1979 album Hot Pickups, while Vintage Guitar magazine listed it in their "Top 10 Guitar Sounds ever recorded".
The Leroi Brothers included the song on their 1984 EP Forget About The Danger Think Of The Fun. 
In 1988, George Thorogood recorded the song on the album Born to Be Bad and released it as a single, and as a music video in which Roy Head had an acting cameo and danced in the final chorus.  
Also in 1988, Johnny Thunders released his version on the album Copy Cats with Patti Palladin.
It was performed in the 1991 film The Commitments.
It appeared on the 2001 album Sing Along with Los Straitjackets, by the Los Straitjackets, featuring Mark Lindsay on lead vocal. 
Bruce Springsteen covered the song on May 13, 2014, in Albany, New York.
It was also covered in 2015 by Billy Gibbons and the BFG's.
Roy Head's son, Sundance Head, and winner of season 11 The Voice, performed it as a duet with his coach Blake Shelton on the Final 4 broadcast on NBC on December 12, 2016.
Otis Redding covered it on his The Soul Album in 1966.

Popular culture
The song was also featured in Quentin Tarantino's 2019 film Once Upon a Time in Hollywood and is included on its soundtrack.

References

External links
 

1965 singles
Billy "Crash" Craddock songs
Roy Head songs
Barbara Mandrell songs
George Thorogood songs
Shakin' Stevens songs
1965 songs